Templer is an English surname, and may refer to:

Bernhard Templer (1865–1935), Austrian Jewish theologian
Cherie Templer (1856–1915), New Zealand painter
George Templer (1781–1843), builder of the Haytor Granite Tramway, Devon, England
Field Marshal Sir Gerald (Walter Robert) Templer (1898-1979), British Army officer who fought in WWI and WWII
James Templer (1722–1782), a British civil engineer
James Templer (canal builder) (1748–1813), builder of the Stover Canal, Devon, England
James Templer (balloon aviator) (1846–1924), early British military pioneer of balloons
John Charles Templer (1814–1874), British lawyer
Karl Templer (fl. 1994–2009), British-born New York-based fashion stylist
Pamela Templer, American ecosystem ecologist
Simon and Peggy Templer (1910s–1990s), British couple dedicated to rescuing mistreated chimpanzees in Spain

See also
 Templer (disambiguation)
 Templers (Pietist sect)